WDIG (1450 AM) is a radio station broadcasting an oldies format. Licensed to Larry Williams, the station serves the Dothan, Alabama, United States, area and features local programming and ABC Radio News.

Former logo

References

External links

DIG
Oldies radio stations in the United States
Radio stations established in 1947
1947 establishments in Alabama